The 1960 SFR Yugoslavia Chess Championship was the 15th edition of SFR Yugoslav Chess Championship. Held in Ljubljana, SFR Yugoslavia, SR Slovenia. The tournament was won by Svetozar Gligorić.

References

External links 
 https://www.chessgames.com/perl/chess.pl?tid=18164
 https://www.partizanopedia.rs/1960%20sah.html

Yugoslav Chess Championships
1960 in chess
Chess